The Eurovision Song Contest 1991 was the 36th edition of the annual Eurovision Song Contest. The contest was held at Studio 15 di Cinecittà on 4 May 1991 and was hosted by former Italian winners Gigliola Cinquetti and Toto Cutugno.

Twenty-two countries took part in the contest with  participating for the first time since , and the  deciding not to participate. This contest was also the last time that the Socialist Federal Republic of Yugoslavia participated, the country would soon be split up opening up new countries to participate in the coming years. It was also the first time that  was represented in their reunited form since East Germany joined West Germany by the German reunification.

Both Sweden and France had received four sets of 12 points, but Sweden had received five sets of 10 points to France's two, so Carola was declared the winner.

Location

The contest was originally scheduled to be held at Teatro Ariston in Sanremo, where the Sanremo Music Festival takes place annually. This was meant for the organisers to pay tribute to the Italian festival that had inspired the creation of the Eurovision Song Contest. However, following the invasion of Kuwait by Iraq and the outbreak of the Gulf War, the host broadcaster RAI decided in January 1991 that to better ensure the security of foreign delegations it would move the contest to Rome. This caused serious organisational problems and delays.

Rome is the capital of Italy and a special comune (named Comune di Roma Capitale). Rome also serves as the capital of the Lazio region. It was later confirmed that the contest would be staged at Cinecittà, a large film studio in Rome, with Studio 15 as the host venue. With an area of 400,000 square metres, it is the largest film studio in Europe, and is considered the hub of Italian cinema. The studios were constructed during the fascist era as part of a scheme to revive the Italian film industry.

Contest overview
The presenters were Gigliola Cinquetti and Toto Cutugno, who represented Italy when they won Eurovision in 1964 and 1990 respectively. Cutugno opened the contest singing "Insieme: 1992", and Cinquetti performed "Non ho l'età". Cutugno had some difficulty with the pronunciation of the song titles and names of the artists and conductors. Despite this, in Italy almost seven million people watched the show. In addition to tallying the vote numbers in English and French, Cinquetti and Cutugno gave each of the jury allotments in Italian as well.

Nearly the entire contest was hosted in Italian, which is not an official language of the European Broadcasting Union (English and French are, and in the Eurovision Song Contest it is mandatory to provide presentation in at least one of those languages). 
The overall staging and production standard received considerable criticism afterwards, including for wasting time which saw the broadcast overshoot its scheduled time allotment and for the haphazard and casual approach of the two presenters throughout but particularly during the voting, which saw Frank Naef, the independent scrutineer of the European Broadcasting Union, often being required to intervene in the process.

Sara Carlson gave the opening performance of the contest, titled "New Day (Celebrate)", a mixture of modern dance in ancient settings of ancient Rome. The performance featured Carlson singing, and a mixture of street dance and classical dance choreographed to popular sounding music of the time. At the time, Carlson had appeared numerous times on Italian television, and this was seen as one of her largest audiences.

This was the last contest where the official logo was in a language other than English (Italian in this case). Since 1992, the official logo of the Eurovision Song Contest has remained in English.

Postcards 
The competing artists were asked to sing a known Italian song which would then be used as a short clip for the postcard. The songs were in order:

 "Non ho l'età" (Gigliola Cinquetti)
 "Se bastasse una canzone" (Eros Ramazzotti)
 "" (Claudio Baglioni)
 "Caruso" (Lucio Dalla)
 "Un'estate italiana" (Edoardo Bennato and Gianna Nannini)
 "Adesso tu" (Eros Ramazzotti)
 "Sarà perché ti amo" (Ricchi e Poveri)
 "Non voglio mica la luna" (Fiordaliso)
 "" (Rita Pavone)
 "Amore scusami" (John Foster)
 "Nel blu, dipinto di blu" (Domenico Modugno)
 "Dio, come ti amo" (Domenico Modugno / Gigliola Cinquetti)
 "Nessun dorma" (from Giacomo Puccini's opera Turandot)
 "Santa Lucia" (traditional)
 "" (Sergio Endrigo / Mary Hopkin)
 "" (Renato Carosone)
 "L'Italiano" (Toto Cutugno)
 "Musica è" (Eros Ramazzotti)
 "Sono tremendo" (Rocky Roberts)
 "Ricordati di me" (Antonello Venditti)
 "Io che amo solo te" (Sergio Endrigo)
 "" (Peppino di Capri)

Participating countries
Twenty-two countries competed this year. The Netherlands did not participate as it conflicted with the Remembrance of the Dead national holiday, and so Malta was allowed to participate in the contest for the first time in 16 years, unable to before due to restrictions on the number of countries allowed to participate.

Conductors
Each performance had a conductor who directed the orchestra.

 Slobodan Marković
 
 Paul Abela
 Haris Andreadis
 Flaviano Cuffari
 Richard Oesterreicher
 Francis Goya
 Anders Berglund
 Jérôme Pillement
 Turhan Yükseler
 Noel Kelehan
 Fernando Correia Martins
 
 
 Kobi Oshrat
 Olli Ahvenlahti
 
 
 Eduardo Leiva
 Ronnie Hazlehurst
 Alexander Kirov Zografov
 Bruno Canfora

Returning artists

Participants and results

Detailed voting results 

Each country had a jury who awarded 12, 10, 8, 7, 6, 5, 4, 3, 2, 1 point(s) for their top ten songs.

During the final vote (Italy) none of the top three contenders - Sweden, Israel and France - had received any points up until the last 12-point vote. This vote went to France and for the first time in twenty-two years, there was a tie for first place, with France overcoming a large deficit to catch up with Sweden. However, since the four-way tie of 1969, the rules had been altered to ensure a single outright winner. The first step in the procedure was to check the number of 12-point votes awarded to each country. Sweden and France were still tied. But when counting the number of 10-point votes, Sweden had more and was finally declared the winner.

Tiebreak results

12 points 
Below is a summary of all 12 points in the final:

Spokespersons 

Each country announced their votes in the order of performance. The following is a list of spokespersons who announced the votes for their respective country.

 Mebrura Topolovac
 Guðríður Ólafsdóttir
 Dominic Micallef
 Fotini Giannoulatou
 Michel Stocker
 
 
 
 
 Canan Kumbasar
 Eileen Dunne
 Maria Margarida Gaspar
 
 
 Yitzhak Shim'oni
 Heidi Kokki
 Christian Eckhardt
 An Ploegaerts
 María Ángeles Balañac
 Colin Berry
 Anna Partelidou
 Rosanna Vaudetti

Broadcasts 

Each participating broadcaster was required to relay the contest via its networks. Non-participating member broadcasters were also able to relay the contest as "passive participants". Broadcasters were able to send commentators to provide coverage of the contest in their own native language and to relay information about the artists and songs to their television viewers. In addition to the participating countries, the contest was also reportedly broadcast in Bulgaria, Czechoslovakia, Hungary, Poland, Romania and the Soviet Union via Intervision, and in Australia and South Korea. Known details on the broadcasts in each country, including the specific broadcasting stations and commentators are shown in the tables below.

Notes

References

External links

 

 
1991
Music festivals in Italy
Music competitions in Italy
1991 in music
1991 in Italy
1990s in Rome
May 1991 events in Europe
Events in Rome